Amanji  is a village in the  
Aranthangi revenue block of Pudukkottai district, Tamil Nadu, India.

Demographics 

As per the 2001 census, Amanji had a total population of  249 with 116 males and 133 females. Out of the total population 189 people were literate.

References

Villages in Pudukkottai district